Gary Jennings (born 21 February 1972) is a male British former hurdler. He competed in the men's 400 metres hurdles at the 1996 Summer Olympics. He represented England in the 400 metres hurdles event, at the 1998 Commonwealth Games in Kuala Lumpur, Malaysia.

References

External links
 

1972 births
Living people
Athletes (track and field) at the 1996 Summer Olympics
British male hurdlers
Olympic athletes of Great Britain
Place of birth missing (living people)
Universiade bronze medalists for Great Britain
Universiade medalists in athletics (track and field)
Athletes (track and field) at the 1998 Commonwealth Games
Medalists at the 1995 Summer Universiade
Commonwealth Games competitors for England